Ramesh Deo (30 January 1929 – 2 February 2022) was an Indian film and television actor who worked in more than 285 Hindi films, 190 Marathi films and 30 Marathi dramas with over 200 showings in his long career. He also produced feature films, television serials and over 250 ad films. He directed a number of films, documentaries and television serials. He received many state and national awards for his works.

Early life
Ramesh Deo was born in Kolhapur, Maharashtra on 30 January 1926. His ancestral roots are from Jodhpur in Rajasthan. His father was a judge of Kolhapur. His ancestors shifted to Kolhapur as his great grandfather and grandfather were both engineers. They had built the Jodhpur Palace. They were called by Chatrapati Shahu Maharaja to build the city of Kolhapur. His grandfather came down to become the chief engineer to Shahu Maharaj, and his father was his legal advisor.

Career
His made his film debut with a cameo appearance in Paatlaachi Por, a Marathi film, in 1951. Andhala Magto Ek Dola (1956), directed by Raja Paranjape, was his first full-fledged role. He started off as a villain. His first Hindi film was Rajshree Productions' Aarti (1962). In his long career, he has played supporting roles in films with Rajesh Khanna in lead namely - Anand, Joroo Ka Ghulam, Aap Ki Kasam, Prem Nagar, Ashanti, Goraa. He has played supporting in Mehrbaan, Dus Lakh, Raampur Ka Lakshman, Fakira, Shatrughan Sinha starer Mere Apne and many more.

In January 2013, he received the Lifetime Achievement Award at the 11th Pune International Film Festival (PIFF).
He worked in Nivdung, a Marathi serial in the year 2006.

Personal life and death
Deo was married to Seema Deo, an actress formerly known as Nalini Saraf. His sons are Marathi actor Ajinkya Deo and Abhinay Deo, director of the 2011 film Delhi Belly. He died at Kokilaben Dhirubhai Ambani Hospital from a heart attack on 2 February 2022, at the age of 96.

Selected filmography

Director
Gosht Lagnanantarchi (2010)

Filmography

Andhala Magto Ek Dola (1955)
Gath Padli Thaka Thaka (1956)
Deoghar (1956)
Saata Janmachi Sobti (1959)... Mohan Mohite
Umaj Padel Tar (1960)
Paishyacha Paaus (1960)
Jagachya Pathivar (1960)
Suvasini (1961)
Majhi Aai (1961)
Vardakshina (1962) ... Shantaram
Bhagya Lakshmi (1962)
Aarti (1962) ... Niranjan
Majha Hoshil Ka? (1963)
Padchhaya (1964)
Shevatcha Malusura (1965)
Love And Murder (1966)
Gurukilli (1966)
Dus Lakh (1966) ... Manohar
Mehrban (1967)
Chimukala Pahuna (1967)
Swapna Tech Lochani (1967)
Shikar (1968) ... Naresh
Saraswatichandra (1968)
Teen Bahuraniyan (1968) 
Man Ka Meet (1968)
Shart (1969) 
Bombay by Nite (1969)
Patni (1970)
 Pardes (1970 film)
Darpan (1970)
Mujrim (1970)... Police Inspector
Jeevan Mrityu (1970)
Mastana
Khilona... Kishore
Chingari
 Albela (1971 film)
Ganga Tera Pani Amrit (1971)
Hulchul (1971)... Dir. Kumar
Lakhon Mein Ek (1971) ... Keshavlal
Anand (1971) ... Dr. Prakash Kulkarni
Mere Apne (1971)... Arun Gupta
Banphool (1971)
Sanjog (1971)
Zameen Aasmaan (1972)
Rampur Ka Lakshman (1972)
Manavataa (1972)
Lalkar (1972)
Koshish (1972)
Joroo Ka Ghulam (1972)
Bees Saal Pehle (1972)
Bansi Birju (1972)
Kashmakash (1973)
Dharma (1973)
Hum Junglee Hain (1973)
Geetaa Mera Naam (1974)
Aashiana (1974)
36 Ghante (1974)
Kora Kagaz (1974)
Prem Nagar (1974)... Lata's Brother
Kasauti (1974)... Heera
Sunehra Sansar (1975)Rani Aur Lalpari (1975)... Neighbour
Owalte Bhauraya (1975)
 Zameer(1975)...Ramu,ServantEk Mahal Ho Sapno Ka (1975)
Aakhri Daao (1975)... Inspector VermaSalaakhen(1975)...GautamNaag Champa (1976)Sankoch (1976)...AvinashDo Ladkiyan (1976)...RameshAaj Ka Ye Ghar (1976)..DeshpandeAaj Ka Mahaatma (1976)Fakira (1976)...RanjitRaees (1976)Janam Janam Na Saath (1977) Gujarati film
 Badla (1977 film) Marathi filmParadh (1977) (Hindi Dubbing Anjaam (1978 film))Jai Dwarkadheesh (1977)...SatdhanwaPrayashchit (1977)Rangaa Aur Raja (1977)Solah Shukrawar (1977)...MohanChalu Mera Naam (1977)...ShakaHeera Aur Patthar (1977)Do Chehere (1977)... Ramesh
Yaaron Ka Yaar (1977)...Shekhar
Yehi Hai Zindagi (1977)... Michael
Hira Aur Patthar (1977)...Gangaram
Jadu Tona (1977)
Dream Girl (1977 film) ...Dr Kapoor
Dost Asava Tar Asa (1978)
Karwa Chouth (1978)
Bapu Ka Sapna (1978)
College Girl (1978)
Bhola Bhala (1978)..Thakur Ajit Singh
Anjane Mein (1978)...Police Inspector Gavaskar
Heeralal Pannalal (1978)
Janki (1979)
Dada (1979)...Pyarelal
Bombay by Nite (1979)
Fatakadi (1980)
Shiv Shakti (1980
Patita (1980)
Farz Aur Pyar (1980)
Dahshat (1981)... Inspector Mulla
Kaaran (1981)
Chhori Gaon Ki (1981)
Bhamta (1982)
Nek Parveen (1982)
Hum Paagal Premee (1982)
Anmol Sitaare (1982)
Daulat ... Dharamdas
Dulha Bikta Hai (1982)
Chambal Ke Daku (1982)
Haathkadi (1982) ... Ambarnath
Shriman Shrimati (1982)
Ashanti ... Inspector Ramesh
Khud-daar (1982) ... Ramnathan
Baiko Asavi Ashi (1983)
Film Hi Film (1983)
Taqdeer (1983) ... Randhir Pratap Singh
Main Awara Hoon (1983) ... Premnath
Savaasher (1984)
Hech Majh Maher (1984) ... Neela's dad
Hum Do Hamare Do (1984)
Pachis Lakh (1984)
Grahasthi (1984)
Sharara (1984)
Laila (1984) ... Chandru
Patthar Dil (1985)
Ek Chitthi Pyar Bhari (1985)
Kabhi Ajnabi The (1985)
Karmyudh (1985) ... Judge
Hum Naujawan (1985)... Principal Verma
Vidhaan (1986)
Jawani Ki Kahani (1986)
Ilzaam (1986)
Kala Dhanda Goray Log (1986) ... Pandey
Pyar Kiya Hai Pyar Karenge (1986)
Allah-Rakha (1986)
Mera Haque (1986) ... Diwan
Khel Mohabbat Ka (1986)
Sarja (1987)...Bahiraji Naik
Sher Shivaji (1987)
Kaamaagni (1987) ...Dinanath
Kanoon Kanoon Hai (1987)
Kudrat Ka Kanoon (1987) ... Judge
 Goraa (1987) ... Inspector Nitin
Inaam Dus Hazaar (1987)
Daku Hasina (1987)
Aulad (1987) ... Dr. Ramesh Chandar
Mera Yaar Mera Dushman (1987) ... Dinesh Kumar
Mr. India (1987) ... Police Inspector
Sindoor (1987 film) ... Judge
Janam Janam (1988) ... Bheem Singh
Sone Pe Suhaaga (1988) ... Ram Prasad Dubey
Waqt Ke Zanjeer (1989)
Gharana (1989) ... Munshi
Toofan (1989) ... Ramesh Kumar
Azaad Desh Ke Gulam (1990) ... Kishore Bhandari
Pratibandh (1990)... Prosecuting Attorney
Ghayal (1990) Varsha's Father
Nishchaiy (1992)
Ulfat Ki Nayi Manzilen (1994)
Hain Kaun Woh (1999)
Vasudev Balwant Phadke (2007)
Galgale Nighale (2008)
Vighnaharta... Shree Siddhivinayak (2009)... Bapuji
Houn Jau De! (2009)
Tinhisanja (2009)
Aahat (2010)
Goshta Lagnanantarchi (2010)
Jetaa (2010)
2014 Raj Ka Ran (2011)... Kakasaheb
Pipaani (2012)
Jolly LLB (2013)... Kaul Sahab
Chaandi (2013)
Sankasur (2013)- Unreleased
Mumbai Tiger (2013)- Unreleased
Ghayal Once Again (2016) Kulkarni And Anushka's Grandfather

See also 

 Seema Deo
 Ajinkya Deo
 Abhinay Deo

References

External links

 
 Ramesh Deo Productions, website

1929 births
2022 deaths
20th-century Indian male actors
Indian male film actors
Male actors in Hindi cinema
Male actors in Marathi cinema
Marathi film directors
People from Kolhapur
People from Amravati
Indian male television actors
Indian television directors
Male actors from Mumbai
Indian television producers
Film directors from Mumbai